Willem van Leen (1753 – 1825) was a Dutch painter.

Leen was born in Dordrecht and became a specialist in flower painting. He is known primarily for his interior decorations for mantelpieces, overdoors, etc. He also collaborated with other painters to paint flowers and fruit in their paintings.

References 

 Record 48826 in the RKD
 

1753 births
1825 deaths
Artists from Dordrecht
19th-century Dutch painters
18th-century Dutch painters
18th-century Dutch male artists